The Provo City School District is a school district in Provo, Utah, United States, which has boundaries that almost entirely coincide with those of the city, except for one small portion.

Description

The school district is run by a school board elected by city residents.  The districts for electing the school board members are drawn by the Provo City Council.  There are currently 17,800 students enrolled.

The district operates two traditional high schools, an alternative high school, two middle schools, thirteen elementary schools, and a web-based school that serves all grade levels. The district continues to have a positive influence on the community by offering both traditional and proven non-traditional education to its students. These non-traditional alternatives include preschool training for disabled students, adult high school completion, the largest selection of on-line courses in the state and concurrent enrollment where students can earn high school and college credits simultaneously. Programs such as advanced placement, special education, music, career technology, elementary dual language, multicultural programs, gifted and talented programs and many other enrichment programs in all curriculum areas are offered by the district. The district has strong technical and foreign language programs in both traditional and on-line offerings, and is one of the few Districts in the state to offer elementary foreign languages.

Board of education
As of January 24, 2021, the following individuals comprised the Provo City School District Board of Education:

Melanie Hall - 
President – District 2

Assigned Schools: Rock Canyon, Centennial

Rebecca Nielsen -
Vice President - District 6

Assigned Schools: Lakeview, Westridge

Nate Bryson -  District 1

Assigned Schools: Canyon Crest, Edgemont, Timpview

McKay Jensen - District 3

Assigned Schools: Wasatch

Jennifer Partridge - District 4

Assigned Schools: Provost, Provo Peaks, Spring Creek

Teri McCabe - 
President – District 5

Assigned Schools: Amelia, Franklin, Sunset View

Gina Hales - District 7

Assigned Schools: Timpanogos, Dixon, Independence, Provo High

District Administration

As of July 25, 2017, Provo City School District Administration was:

Keith C. Rittel - 
Superintendent

Douglas Finch - 
Assistant Superintendent over Student Services

Anne-Marie Harrison - 
Assistant Superintendent over Teaching and Learning

Jarod Sites - 
Director of Human Resources

Rebecca Rogers - 
Director of Human Resource - Classified Employees and Benefits

Stefanie Bryant - 
Business Administrator

Devyn Dayley - 
Director of Accounting

Laura Larsen - 
Director of Child Nutrition

Alex Judd - 
Assistant Superintendent over Elementary Education

Todd McKee - 
Assistant Superintendent over Secondary Education

Mark Wheeler - 
Director of Facilities

Suraj Syal - 
Director of Special Education

Chad Duncan - 
Director of Technology

Caleb Price - 
Coordinator of Communications and Public Relations

Opportunities for the Gifted and Talented

Magnet schools
Students who qualify are invited to attend the Center for Accelerated Studies (CAS) for students in grades four through six. This special school caters to the needs of the profoundly gifted. The Gifted Magnet Program in the district is for students in grades seven through eight and provides services to students who score in the top ten on a highly difficult test by giving them access to high school-level material while remaining with their middle school-aged peers. This program has been updated and is now folded into the two middle schools in the district: Dixon Middle School and Centennial Middle School.

Dual Language Immersion Programs
The Dual Language Immersion program gives elementary students the opportunity to become fluent in an additional language by the time he or she exits the sixth grade.

Schools with Dual Language Immersion Programs:
 Canyon Crest Elementary—Spanish
 Edgemont Elementary—French
 Timpanogos Elementary—Spanish
 Wasatch Elementary—Mandarin Chinese
 Lakeview Elementary—Portuguese

Provo School District Foundation
The Provo School District Foundation facilitates charitable giving that fund programs and services not provided by the state or federal government, including after-school activities. The Foundation passes resources from contributors to the schools, classrooms and programs that need the most assistance, or can be designated to the entity the donor sees most fit.

Schools

High schools

 Provo High School
Jarod Sites, Principal
 Timpview High School
Dr. Fidel Montero, Principal
 Independence High School
Jacob Griffith, Principal

Middle schools

 Centennial Middle School
Kyle Bates, Principal
 Dixon Middle School
John Anderson, Principal

Elementary schools

 Amelia Earhart Elementary School
Ryan McCarty, Principal
 Canyon Crest Elementary School
Sean Edwards, Principal
 Edgemont Elementary School
Harmony Kartchner , Principal
 Franklin Elementary School
Jason Benson, Principal
 Lakeview Elementary School
Jamie Leite, Principal
 Provo Peaks Elementary School
Mark Burge, Principal
 Provost Elementary School
Kami Alvarez, Principal
 Rock Canyon Elementary School
Seth Hansen Principal
 Spring Creek Elementary School
Ruthann Snow, Principal
 Sunset View Elementary School
Chris Chilcoat, Principal
 Timpanogos Elementary School
Carrie Rawlins, Principal
 Wasatch Elementary School
Chris Furhiman, Principal
 Westridge Elementary School
Kim Hawkins, Principal

Specialized Schools
 Provo Adult Education
Nikki Wake, Principal
 Provo Transition Services/East Bay Post High
Brent McCabe, Principal
 Sunrise Preschool
, Facilitator
 Oak Springs School
Travis Cook, Principal
 Adult ESOL
 Teresa Tavares, Principal
 E-School
 Brad Monks, Principal

See also

 List of school districts in Utah

References

External links

 

School districts in Utah
Provo, Utah
Education in Utah County, Utah